Kelaa (Dhivehi: ކެލާ) is one of the inhabited islands of Haa Alif Atoll and geographically part of Thiladhummathi Atoll in the north of the Maldives.  It is an island-level administrative constituency governed by the Kelaa Island Council. It is situated 400km west of Trivandrum the capital city of Indian state of Kerala.

History
In 1934, the British established a staging post here and until the end of World War II, it functioned as the northerly counterpart to RAF Gan in the south of the country. A mosque built during the reign of Sultan Mohamed Ibn Ali (Muhammad Mohyeddine) (AD 1692-1701) of the Utheemy Dynastry still stands today as a historical place of interest on the island. This was the king who re-established the Islamic penal code.

Geography

Demography

References

External links
ha.kelaa more info

Islands of the Maldives